The Académie de la Grande Chaumière is an art school in the Montparnasse district of Paris, France.

History 
The school was founded in 1904 by the Catalan painter Claudio Castelucho on the rue de la Grande Chaumière in Paris, near the Académie Colarossi. From 1909, the Académie was jointly directed by  painters Martha Stettler, Alice Dannenberg, and Lucien Simon. The school, which was devoted to painting and sculpture, did not teach the strict academic rules of painting of the École des Beaux-Arts, thus producing art free of academic constraints. One attraction was the low fees, even lower than those of the Académie Julian (which had to be paid in advance). It was said about the school that all that was provided was a model and warmth in the winter.

In 1957, the Académie de la Grande Chaumière was acquired by the Charpentier family, founders of the Charpentier Academy. It still operates under its original name, and provides two free workshops, one for painting and drawing, the other for sketches, as well as evening classes.

Teachers

Former students

References

Sources
Dr. Eric Cabris, Ph.D., Biografie van kunstschilder Ghislaine de Menten de Horne (1908–1995), Brussels, V.U.B., 2008, p. 4, footnote 3.
Antoine Bourdelle,  Laure Dalon, Cours & leçons à l'Académie de la Grande Chaumière, 1909–1929, Paris : Paris-Musées : Ed. des Cendres, 2008.

External links 
 Official site
 (fr)André del Debbio – La Grande Chaumière

Art schools in Paris
Education in Paris
Buildings and structures in the 6th arrondissement of Paris
1904 establishments in France